Alain-Michel Boudet (born 16 March 1940) is a French biological researcher. He is a member of the French Academy of sciences and the French Academy of technologies.

Studies 
Alain-Michel Boudet began his studies at the Paul Sabatier University in Toulouse. He continued his studies at several international institutions: the University of East Anglia (1973), the University of California at Davis (1978), the University of Fribourg (1982),and  the University of Ghent (1991).

Career 
Boudet is the initiator of the Centre Pierre Potier Itav which is located in the Toulouse oncopole and whose objective is to encourage interdisciplinary collaborations and to bring private and public research closer together.

Other functions 
 Advisor to the board of directors of the association Science Animation
 President of the Academy of sciences, Inscriptions and Belles-lettres of Toulouse

Scientific works 
Boudet has had more than 160 articles in peer-reviewed journals, several books published, and five patents, He is the organizer of several international colloquia.

Bibliography 
 Voyage Au Coeur De La Matiere Plastique : Les microstructures des polymères, CNRS, 2003,

References

1940 births
French biologists
Members of the French Academy of Sciences
Living people